The fourth and final season of Hart of Dixie an American comedy-drama television series, originally aired in the United States on The CW from December 15, 2014 through March 27, 2015, with a total of 10 episodes. Hart of Dixie was cancelled after four seasons on May 7, 2015.

Overview
The final season deals with Zoe's pregnancy and her relationship with Wade. George, Lemon, Lavon and Annabeth enter a tumultuous love affair while Brick has to deal with his past in order to move forward.

Cast and characters

Regular
 Rachel Bilson as Dr. Zoe Hart
 Scott Porter as George Tucker
 Jaime King as Lemon Breeland
 Cress Williams as Lavon Hayes
 Wilson Bethel as  Wade Kinsella
 Kaitlyn Black as Annabeth Nass
 Tim Matheson as Dr. Brick Breeland

Recurring Characters
 Reginald VelJohnson as Dash DeWitt
 Brandi Burkhardt as Crickett Watts
 McKaley Miller as Rose Hattenbarger
 Claudia Lee as Magnolia Breeland
 Mircea Monroe as Tansy Truitt
 Laura Bell Bundy as Shelby Sinclair
 Armelia McQueen as Shula Whitaker
 Maree Cheatham as Bettie Breeland
 JoBeth Williams as Candice Hart
 John Marshall Jones as Wally Maynard
 Charlie Robinson as Sergeant Jeffries
 Karla Mosley as Elodie Baxter
 Anne Ramsay as Winifred Wilkes
 Erica Piccininni as Jaysene Charles
 Talitha Bateman as Scarlett Kincaid
 Ross Philips as Tom Long
 Mallory Moye as Wanda Lewis
 Matt Lowe as Meatball
 Steven M. Porter as Frank Moth
 Peter Mackenzie as Reverend Peter Mayfair
 Christopher Curry as Earl Kinsella
 John Eric Bentley as Sheriff Bill
 Alan Autry as Todd Gainey
 Kim Robillard as Sal
 Dawn Didawick as Eugenia
 Esther Scott as Delma Warner
 Carla Renata as Susie
 Ilene Graff as Clora Tucker
 Nicole J. Butler as Prizzi Pritchett
 Nakia Burrise as Patty Pritchett
 Megan Ferguson as Daisy
 Lindsey Van Horn as Amy-Rose
 McKayla Maroney as Tonya
 Aynsley Bubbico as Sadie
 Matt Hobby as Rudy Pruitt
 Bill Parks as Chicken Truitt
 Kevin Sheridan as Rockett Truitt
 Tony Cavalero as Stanley Watts
 Lawrence Pressman as Vernon 'Brando' Wilkes
 Eric Pierpoint as Harold Tucker

Special Guest Star
 Meredith Monroe as Alice Kincaid
 Autumn Reeser as Olivia Green

Episodes

Casting
Erica Piccininni was cast as the new firefighter and love interest for Brandi Burkhardt's character, Crickett Watts. Dawson's Creek star Meredith Monroe was cast as Lemon's estranged mother, Alice Kincaid and Talitha Bateman was cast as her daughter, Scarlett Kincaid.

Cancellation
The third season saw the series begin a ratings decline, averaging a .6 in the 18-to-49 demo and 1.6 million viewers. Ratings rose in the fourth season, but was not enough to sustain a renewal.

Series creator Leila Gerstein later hinted to fans via Twitter that the series was unlikely to return for a fifth season, and the final episode of the season had the definite feel of being a series finale.

On the 29th of July, 2015, Rachel Bilson put to rest the rumours surrounding the cancellation of the series once and for all via her Instagram account.

Broadcast
Season four of Hart of Dixie premiered on The CW in the United States on December 15, 2014. The series moved to Fridays regular timeslot starting with the second episode. The CW's president said in January 2015, It is "not necessarily" Hart of Dixies final season, Pedowitz said. With only the second episode of the current season airing this Friday, "We have to see the ratings." As for this season's last episode, he said, "If [Dixie] ends, it's a great series finale. And if it doesn't end, it's a great season finale."

Reception
The season premiere was up from the previous season with 1.22 million people tuning in. The first episode had a 0.4 rating share for adults 18-49.

The series finale saw the highest ratings of the series since season two's episode 17 episode that aired in 2013. The series finale had 1.33 million people tune in with and audience share of 0.4 for adults 18-49.

Home Release
Hart of Dixie: The Fourth and Final Season was released on DVD in the U.S. on October 27, 2015. The 2 disc set includes all 10 episodes from the fourth and final season and various language and subtitle options.

References

2014 American television seasons
2015 American television seasons